Charles Chauncy (1 January 1705 – 10 February 1787) was an American Congregational clergyman. He is known for his opposition to the First Great Awakening and his contributions to the development of Unitarianism and Liberal Protestantism, particularly his insistence on rational religion and defense of universal salvation.

Life and career
Chauncy was born into the elite Puritan merchant class that ruled Boston, Massachusetts. His great-grandfather, Charles Chauncy, after whom he was named, was the second president of Harvard College. His father was a successful Boston merchant. Chauncy was educated at the Boston Latin School and at Harvard, where he received both his undergraduate degree and his master's in theology. In 1727, Chauncy was ordained as an assistant minister of Boston's First Church, the oldest Congregational church in the city and one of the most important in New England. In 1762, Chauncy became pastor of First Church. He served the congregation for 60 years until his death.

Chauncy was an opponent of the First Great Awakening, which split the Congregational churches between Old Light and New Light factions. As a leader of the Old Lights, Chauncy spoke out against religious enthusiasm stirred up by revival preachers. Chauncy was also a leader of the opposition against appointing an Anglican bishop for the American colonies. During the American Revolution, he supported the Patriot cause through sermons and pamphlets. According to religious studies scholars Norman and Lee Gibbs, Chauncy deserves the title "theologian of the American Revolution".

Chauncy was a charter member of the American Academy of Arts and Sciences (1780) and was granted an honorary Doctor of Divinity degree from the University of Edinburgh. He  was recognized by the Massachusetts Historical Society (when his portrait was hung there) as "eminent for his talents, learning, and lover of liberty, civil and religious."

Theology
Despite his Puritan heritage, Chauncy opposed Calvinism and its doctrine of total depravity. He held liberal Arminian views on free will, believing that human beings have God-given "natural powers" that were meant to be nurtured toward "an actual likeness to God in knowledge, righteousness, and true holiness". Chauncy and fellow liberal Congregationalists Jonathan Mayhew and Ebenezer Gay were influenced by Enlightenment thought. They called for a "supernatural rationalism" that affirmed both reason and divine revelation as contained in the Bible.

The traditional view among scholars has been that Chauncy deviated from orthodox Trinitarian theology and that his Christology was Arian. Norman and Lee Gibbs, however, argue that Chauncy's views have been misunderstood and misrepresented. They argue Chauncy's theology was Trinitarian, not Arian, and that he had a kenotic theology in regards to the Incarnation.

In 1785 (two decades after completion), Chauncy anonymously published his major theological work, The Mystery Hid from Ages and Generations. In it, Chauncy presented 400 pages of biblical support for universal salvation, the belief that God wills and ensures the salvation of all humanity. Chauncy is seen as an important figure in the development of the American Unitarian tradition and Liberal Protestantism.

Works

References

Further reading
 
 

1705 births
1787 deaths
Clergy from Boston
American Congregationalist ministers
Christian universalist clergy
Harvard College alumni
Fellows of the American Academy of Arts and Sciences
18th-century Christian clergy
18th-century American clergy